Sales & Marketing Executives International (SMEI) is a worldwide non-profit organization offering membership and professional sales and marketing certification. SMEI is dedicated to ethical standards, continuing professional development, knowledge sharing, and mentoring students. Founded in 1935 in the U.S. as the National Federation of Sales Executives, the organization grew to become the largest in the world for sales and marketing managers by the late 1940s.

Founding principles
SMEI’s activities are guided by five founding principles, designed to strengthen principles and practice of the profession.

Professional Standards and Identification: The improvement of the standards for professional selling, sales management and marketing, in order to establish sales and marketing as a recognized profession.
Continuing Education: The planning and implementation of educational programs of the membership to enable members to keep up-to-date with changes in the marketplace and to grow as professionals. The planning and implementation of organized training programs for professional selling, sales management, and marketing.
Sharing Knowledge: The establishment of discussion forums, for example, web meetings, online networking and conferences which enable members to share sales and marketing experiences and knowledge.
Assist Students: The establishment of programs to work with students at the high school and college levels to enable them to understand the excellent career opportunities in the sales and marketing profession. This objective ultimately led to the current SMEI sponsored programs with Distributive Education Clubs of America (DECA).
Support the Free Enterprise System: In recognizing that sales and marketing is the energizing force that drives the competitive marketplace.

Professional certification

For the credibility of the profession, SMEI established professional certifications in marketing and sales for professionals who have met and surpassed high standards of education, experience, knowledge, and ethical conduct. In 1984, Sales & Marketing Executives International, Inc. (SMEI) established sales certification and marketing certification programs for professionals to complete in order to be able to use its professional designations.

Certified Marketing Executive – CME
For marketing managers and top level executives.

Certified Sales Executive – CSE
 For sales managers, company owners and top level executives.

SMEI Certified Professional Salesperson – SCPS
 For sales representatives and professionals

SMEI Certified Professional Marketer – SCPM
• For marketing representatives

Executive Leadership 
Willis Turner, CAE CME CSE is the President & CEO of Sales & Marketing Executives International (1999 -

Awards

SMEI has two primary award programs that recognize individuals as exemplary in the field of sales and marketing:
 SMEI Academy of Achievement: Individuals receiving this award include, among others, Frederick W. Smith, founder of FedEx; Steve Case, founder of AOL; Mary Kay Ash, founder of Mary Kay; Jeffrey Hayzlett, former Chief Marketing Officer at Kodak; Henry Bloch, founder of H&R Block; and Stephen Covey; founder of FranklinCovey.
 SMEI Distinguished Sales & Marketing Award or Distinguished Sales Award

Locations
SMEI has the following locations:

New York, NY, USA – Registered Address and USA Operations
Vancouver, Canada – Canadian Operations
Rotterdam, Netherlands – Europe Operations
Beijing, China – China Operations
Middle East – Licensed Operations, including Turkey, Lebanon, Iraq, UAE
Mexico – Affiliated Operations
Puerto Rico – Affiliated Operations
Ho Chi Minh City, Vietnam, Vietnam Operations

External links
Official website

Organizations established in 1935
Professional associations based in the United States
Sales professional associations